Hoyt Head is a high rock headland forming the northeastern end of Bowyer Butte, located at the west side of Venzke Glacier on the coast of Marie Byrd Land, Antarctica. The headland was first seen and photographed from aircraft of the U.S. Antarctic Service in December 1940, was mapped by the United States Geological Survey from surveys and U.S. Navy air photos, 1959–66, and was named by the Advisory Committee on Antarctic Names for Lieutenant Ronnie A. Hoyt, U.S. Navy Reserve, Officer-in-Charge at Byrd Station in 1971.

References

Headlands of Marie Byrd Land